The Christ as the Suffering Redeemer  is a painting by the Italian Renaissance artist Andrea Mantegna, dated to  1488–1500 and housed in the Statens Museum for Kunst, Copenhagen, Denmark.

History
The work is generally assigned to Mantegna's stay in Rome, due to stylistic similarities with the Madonna of the Quarry, although other art historians considered it from the 1490s.

The painting appears in an inventory of the Gonzaga family from 1627, and it belonged to cardinal Silvio Valenti Gonzaga in 1763 when it became part of the Danish Royal, having been acquired by King Frederick IV of Denmark to make his collection equal to those of other European reigning families.

Description
The painting is signed on the edge of the marble base and his an original version of the traditional Pietà theme. Christ, portrayed with open hands to show all the wounds of the crucifixion, is raised on finely sculpted ancient sarcophagus.

His body is wrapped in a metallic white drape, and his supported by two kneeling angels (a seraphim and a cherubim). On the left the tomb's cover is visible, while the background is occupied by a far landscape under the sunset light. On the right is the Calvary and a quarry in which two men are working a slab, a column and a statue. Two further workers can be seen in a grotto, illuminated by an internal source of light.  Finally, on the left are fields with shepherds and cattle and a walled city, Jerusalem, at the feet of a rocky spur. Two pious women run a path to reach Jesus' tomb.

Sources

Further reading
 Kleiner, Frank S. Gardner's Art Through the Ages, 13th Edition, 2008
La Grande Storia dell'Arte - Il Quattrocento, Il Sole 24 Ore, 2005
 Manca, Joseph. Andrea Mantegna and the Italian Renaissance, 2006

15th-century paintings
Paintings by Andrea Mantegna
Paintings depicting Jesus
Angels in art
Paintings in the collection of the National Gallery of Denmark
Gonzaga art collection
15th-century paintings in Denmark